Cook County Board of Commissioners 9th district is a electoral district for the Cook County Board of Commissioners.

The district was established in 1994, when the board transitioned to holding elections in individual districts, as opposed to the previous practice of holding a set of two at-large elections (one for ten seats from the city of Chicago and another for seven seats from suburban Cook County).

Geography
The district has, since its inception, covered portions of Chicago's Far Northwest Side and its northwest suburbs.

1994 boundaries
When the district was first established, the district represented parts of the Northwest side of Chicago and the northern suburbs of Cook County, and the western suburbs of Cook County.

2001 redistricting
New boundaries were adopted in August 2001, with redistricting taking place following the 2000 United States Census.

In regards to townships and equivalent jurisdictions, the district's redistricted boundaries included portions of the city of Chicago and portions of the Leyden, Maine, Norwood Park, Oak Park, and River Forest townships.

2012 redistricting
The district currently, as redistricted in 2012 following the 2010 United States Census, includes the Norwood Park and Dunning areas of Chicago as well as the suburbs of Arlington Heights, Des Plaines, Elmwood Park, Franklin Park, Glenview, Harwood Heights, Melrose Park, Morton Grove, Mount Prospect, Niles, Norridge, Park Ridge, Prospect Heights, River Forest, River Grove, Rosemont and Schiller Park.

In regards to townships and equivalent jurisdictions, it includes portions of the city of Chicago, and portions of Elk Grove, Leyden,  Maine, Northfield, Norwood Park, Proviso, River Forest, Wheeling townships.

The district is 59.54 square miles (38,103.37 acres).

2022 redistricting
The district was redistricted following the 2020 United States Census. Its redistricting was seen as having made the district's voter demography more Republican-leaning than it had previously been.

Politics
The district has only ever been represented by Republican commissioner Peter N. Silvestri.

At its inception, the district was originally projected to be a "swing district", with both major parties having a fair chance of winning the district.

List of commissioners representing the district

Election results

|-
| colspan=16 style="text-align:center;" |Cook County Board of Commissioners 9th district general elections
|-
!Year
!Winning candidate
!Party
!Vote (pct)
!Opponent
!Party
! Vote (pct)
!Opponent
!Party
! Vote (pct)
|-
|1994
| |Peter N. Silvestri
| | Republican
| | 
| | Marco Domico
| | Democratic
| | 
|
|
|
|-
|1998
| |Peter N. Silvestri
| | Republican
| | 47,720 (55.76%)
| | Joan A. Sullivan
| | Democratic
| | 37,854 (44.24%)
|
|
|
|-
|2002
| |Peter N. Silvestri
| | Republican
| |50,343 (53.67%)
| | Robert Martwick
| | Democratic
| | 43,452 (46.33%)
|
|
|
|-
|2006
| |Peter N. Silvestri
| | Republican
| |47,881 (56.61%)
| | Jodi L. Biancalana
| | Democratic
| | 36,701 (43.39%)
|
|
|
|-
|2010
| |Peter N. Silvestri
| | Republican
| |47,333 (55.29%)
| | Cary Capparelli
| | Democratic
| | 31,186 (36.43%)
| | Brock Merck
| | Green
| | 7,084 (8.28%)
|-
|2014
| |Peter N. Silvestri
| | Republican
| |51,290 (63.06%)
| | Frank L. McPartlin
| | Democratic
| | 30,040 (36.94%)
|
|
|
|-
|2018
| |Peter N. Silvestri
| | Republican
| |55,612 (52.24%)
| | Frank L. McPartlin
| | Democratic
| | 50,839 (47.76%)  
|
|
|
|-
|2022
| |Maggie Trevor
| | Democratic
| |53,531 (50.32%)
| | Matt Podgorski
| | Republican
| | 52,851 (49.68%)
|
|
|

References

Cook County Board of Commissioners districts
Constituencies established in 1994
1994 establishments in Illinois